Steve Stone is the name of:

 Steve Stone (baseball) (born 1947), American baseball player and broadcaster
 Steve Stone (footballer) (born 1971), former English footballer
 Steve Stone (ice hockey) (born 1952), retired Canadian ice hockey player
 Steve Stone (rugby league) (born 1969), Australian rugby league player
 Steve Stone, with Dream Theater
 Steve Stone, a fictional, recurring character during seasons 1 and 2 of the Manifest (TV series)

See also
 Steven Stone, a character in the Pokémon series